Beat Club is the ninth studio album by Australian rock band The Black Sorrows. The album was released in November 1998. 
Australian music journalist, Ian McFarlane described it as containing "R&B-tinged jazz and blues tunes" 

At the ARIA Music Awards of 1999, Beat Club was nominated for ARIA Award for Best Adult Contemporary Album, losing to Messenger by Jimmy Little.

In 1998, The Black Sorrows were Joe Camilleri, James Black, Tony Floyd, Stephen Hadley, Joe Creighton and Nick Haywood. They were joined on the album by numerous special guests: Renee Geyer, Sam Keevers, James Sherlock, Rick Formosa, Phil Burston, Stuart Fraser, Ian Chaplin, Ed Bates, Peter Luscombe, Kerryn Tolhurst, Robert Burke, Strings of the Victorian Philharmonic Orchestra, Anthony ‘Tok’ Norris, Paul Williamson, Nick Smith, Wayne Burt and Michael Barker.

Critical reception

The Bulletin called the album "His best The Black Sorrows album in a decade!" Rip It Up in Adelaide said: "Beat Club is one of the great Black Sorrows records and also one of the best Australian releases this year". Rave from Brisbane said; "The best thing Joe has done in his long and distinguished career". Time Off Brisbane said: "Hats off to Joe Camilleri. Who would have thought that at this stage of The Black Sorrows’ career Joe would have come up with an album to just about rival the definitive Hold On To Me. Beat Club is a triumph!"

Track listing
CD track listing (MUSH33167.2)

References

External links
 "Beat Club" at discogs.com

1998 albums
The Black Sorrows albums
Mushroom Records albums
Albums produced by Joe Camilleri